Amme Bhagavathi is a 1987 Indian Malayalam film, directed by Sreekumaran Thampi. The film stars Shankar, Menaka, Sukumari and Jagathy Sreekumar in the lead roles. The film has musical score by M. S. Viswanathan. The story of this film is related to the famous Chottanikkara Bhagavathy Temple in Ernakulam district.

Cast

Shankar as Sivankutty
Menaka as Parvathy
Sukumari as Ponnamma
Jagathy Sreekumar
Innocent as Brahmin
Kalaranjini as Saraswathi
Baby Shalini as Durga
Janardanan as Swami Siddhan
Kollam Thulasi as Pappachan
Lalithasree as Alamelu
M. G. Soman
Sreenath as Thirumeni
Thara Kalyan as Chottanikkara Devi
Suresh Bheemsingh

Soundtrack
The music was composed by M. S. Viswanathan and the lyrics were written by Sreekumaran Thampi, who himself wrote, produced and directed this film.

References

External links
 

1987 films
1980s Malayalam-language films
Films scored by M. S. Viswanathan
Films directed by Sreekumaran Thampi